Xavier Elijah Johnson (born October 14, 1999) is an American college basketball player for the Indiana Hoosiers of the Big Ten Conference. He previously played for the Pittsburgh Panthers.

Early life and high school career
Johnson grew up in Spotsylvania County, Virginia but moved to Woodbridge, Virginia to be closer to Bishop O'Connell High School after he enrolled at the school. He entered high school at 5'6, but grew six inches by his senior year. He became Bishop O'Connell's starting point guard as a junior and was named second team All-Washington Catholic Athletic Conference (WCAC) after averaging 10.5 points, 4.2 rebounds and 3.4 assists. Johnson was named the (WCAC) Player of the Year, as well a first team All-State and first team All-Metro by The Washington Post, as a senior after averaging 18.4 points, 4.0 rebounds and 4.3 assists per game. Rated the 39th-best point guard prospect in his class by ESPN and a three-star recruit by 247Sports, Johnson originally committed to play college basketball at the University of Nebraska over Georgetown and Georgia Tech. Johnson requested that Nebraska release him from his National Letter of Intent in the spring of his senior year after the departure of the assistant coach who recruited him. He ultimately committed to play at the University of Pittsburgh.

College career

Pittsburgh
As a freshman, Johnson led the Panthers with 15.5 points and 4.5 assists per game while also averaging 3.9 rebounds and 1.3 steals per game and was named to the Atlantic Coast Conference (ACC) All-Freshman team. He was the first Pitt freshman to lead the team is scoring since 1985 and was the only player in the ACC to average at least 15.0 points and 4.5 assists per game.

Going into his sophomore season (2019–20), Johnson was named the 75th-best collegiate basketball player by CBS Sports and the 51st-best prospect for the 2020 NBA draft by ESPN. Johnson scored 13 points in the Fort Myers TipOff against Kansas State, with four points coming in the last ten seconds to help secure a 63–59 win. He scored 20 points with six rebounds and six assists against North Carolina on January 18, 2020 to help close out the Panthers' first-ever season sweep of UNC. Johnson finished the season with 11.7 points, 4.9 assists, 3.7 rebounds and 1.8 steals per game. As a junior, he averaged 14.2 points, 5.7 assists and 3.4 rebounds per game.

Indiana Hoosiers
For his fourth year, the 2021–22 season, Johnson put his name in the transfer portal and chose to play for the Indiana Hoosiers over Baylor, Houston, and Saint Joseph's, among others. Although Indiana already possessed two point guards, new Hoosiers coach Mike Woodson chose Johnson for the starting role.

Initially, his "aggressive style of play and headstrong attitude on the court" held him back.  In early February Johnson was one of five Indiana players suspended by coach Mike Woodson for violating curfew but was reinstated on February 10, after missing one game. But through the course of the season Johnson found his footing. After a poor performance mid-season in the Crossroads Classic, Johnson gave "an almost perfect shooting performance" against Maryland with 24 points on 100 percent shooting from the floor and 7-of-8 from the free throw line, missing his only shot with 19 seconds left in the game. Johnson credited his mid-season turnaround to his grandfather's death in early February, along with strong chemistry with fellow teammate Trayce Jackson-Davis. He ended the season averaging 12.1 points and 5.1 assist per game. His 172 assists that year were the 5th most in a season in Indiana Hoosiers men's basketball history.

Although Johnson played four seasons, he retained one more year of eligibility, allowing him to play in the 2022–23 season. Prior to the season beginning he was named Honorable Mention All-Big Ten by the media. Johnson averaged 10.9 points, 3.5 rebounds and 5.2 assists per game. He broke his foot in December 2022, forcing him to miss the rest of the season.

Personal life
On April 3, 2022, Johnson was arrested in Bloomington, Indiana, for reckless driving and resisting arrest. He later remarked, "I thought my career was over, honestly. I got my second chance. I’m mad at myself for doing something like that, but I’m glad God gave me a second chance to come back and play, what I love to do." Head coach Mike Woodson, who said he took away Johnson's driving privileges, noted that Johnson grew a lot and took advantage of his second chance: "X has grown a lot, based on the things that he's done this summer. He's put himself in a wonderful position with me being the coach that I like everything about what X is doing now, because he is doing the right things on and off the court."

Career statistics

|-
| style="text-align:left;"| 2018–19
| style="text-align:left;"| Pittsburgh
| 33 || 33 || 31.2 || .415 || .352 || .751 || 3.9 || 4.5 || 1.3 || .1 || 15.5
|-
| style="text-align:left;"| 2019–20
| style="text-align:left;"| Pittsburgh
| 33 || 32 || 33.2 || .373 || .330 || .761 || 3.7 || 4.9 || 1.8 || .2 || 11.7
|-
| style="text-align:left;"| 2020–21
| style="text-align:left;"| Pittsburgh
| 18 || 16 || 28.6 || .426 || .321 || .787 || 3.4 || 5.7 || 1.3 || .2 || 14.2
|-
| style="text-align:left;"| 2021-22
| style="text-align:left;"| Indiana
| 34 || 34 || 27.7 || .406 || .383 || .782 || 3.8 || 5.1 || 1.2 || .1 || 12.1
|- class="sortbottom"
| style="text-align:center;" colspan="2"| Career
| 118 || 115 || 30.3 || .403 || .348 || .767 || 3.7 || 5.0 || 1.4 || .2 || 13.3

References

External links
Indiana Hoosiers bio
Pittsburgh Panthers bio

1999 births
Living people
American men's basketball players
Basketball players from Virginia
Indiana Hoosiers men's basketball players
People from Spotsylvania County, Virginia
Pittsburgh Panthers men's basketball players
Point guards